HC Motor Zaporizhzhia is a Ukrainian men's handball club that currently  based in Düsseldorf and competes in the 2. Handball-Bundesliga and in the EHF European League.

History 
The team "Zaporozhalyuminstroy" was created in 1958 at the trust "Zaporozhalyuminstroy" by the playing coach Semyon Polonsky and dominated the regional championship. The colors of "ZAS" were defended by: Victor Budarin, Z. Aizen, Alexey Gusak, Vladimir Zolotarev, V. Meerson, A. Omelyanenko, Valery Stupak, Vladimir Chaika, Alexander Shirokov.

In 1962 the team "Zaporozhalyuminstroy" together with Kyiv "Burevisnyk" formed a duet of Ukrainian clubs that made their debut in the first USSR handball championship.

USSR championship 

 1963 — the silver medalist of the USSR championship, champion of the CS DSO "Avangard", the first international match in Zaporizhzhia: "ZAS" — the youth team of Romania. Five players of the team were awarded the title "Master of Sports of the USSR", and their mentor Anatoly Muzykantov — the title "Honored Coach of the Ukrainian SSR".
 1964 — silver medalist of the USSR championship, champion of Ukraine.
 1965 — bronze medalist of the USSR championship, silver medalist of the Ukrainian championship.
 1966 — silver medalist of the Ukrainian championship.
 1967 — winner of the 31st Ukrainian Championship.
 1968 — bronze medalist of the USSR championship.
 1969 — silver medalist of the Ukrainian championship.
 1970 — silver medalist of the Ukrainian championship.
 1972 — silver medalist of the Ukrainian championship.
 1973 — silver medalist of the Ukrainian championship.
 1976 — champion of Ukraine.
 1977 — silver medalist of the Ukrainian championship.
 1978 — bronze medalist of the Ukrainian championship.
 1980 — bronze medalist of the Ukrainian championship.
 1981 — silver medalist of the Ukrainian championship.
 1984 — bronze medalist of the Ukrainian championship.

Ukrainian championship 

 1997 — the team resumed performances in the championships of Ukraine under the new name "ZNTU—ZAS", represents the Zaporizhzhia National Technical University.
 2002/2003 — Winner of small silver medals in the Ukrainian Championship among the teams of the major league "B".
 2003/2004 — the winner of the Ukrainian championship among the top league teams.
 2006/2007 — winner of the Ukrainian championship among the top league teams; winner of the Student League of Ukraine.
 2007/2008 — debut in the Ukrainian Championship Superleague — 6th place.
 2008/2009 — 4th place in the Ukrainian Championship among Super League teams, the right to participate in the Challenge Cup.
 2009 — the handball club "ZNTU—ZAS" takes on the balance of Motor Sich OJSC, the team gets a new name "Motor—ZNTU—ZAS".
 2009/2010 — 4th place in the Ukrainian Championship among Super League teams.
 2010/2011 — 4th place in the Ukrainian Championship among Super League teams.
 2011/2012 — 2nd place in the Ukrainian Championship among Super League teams, bronze medalist of the National Cup
 2012/2013 — 1st place in the Ukrainian Championship among Super League teams, winner of the National Cup
 2013/2014 — 1st place in the Ukrainian Championship among Super League teams, silver in the National Cup, holder of the Belgazprombank Cup
 2014/2015 — 1st place in the Ukrainian Championship among Super League teams, winner of the National Cup, winner of the Super Cup.
 2015/2016 — 1st place in the Ukrainian Championship among Super League teams, winner of the National Cup, winner of the Super Cup.
 2018/2019 — 1st place in the Ukrainian Championship among Super League teams, winner of the National Cup.

Accomplishments
 Ukrainian Men's Handball Super League:
 : 2013, 2014, 2015, 2016, 2017, 2018, 2019, 2020, 2021
 SEHA League Finals
 : 2021

European record

Team

Current squad
Squad for the 2022–23 season

Goalkeepers
 12  Mikhail Budko
 55  Gennadiy Komok
Left Wingers
 11  Zakhar Denysov
 31  Oleksandr Kasai
Right Wingers
5  Iurii Kubatko
 19  Eduard Kravchenko
Line players
 20  Olexii Tomashevsky
 23  Oleksandr Onufriienko
 77  Dmytro Tiutiunnyk

Left Backs
 17  Ihor Turchenko
 18  Karlos Molina
 24  Dmytro Horiha
Central Backs
 21  Vitalii Horovyi
Right Backs
7  Ilya Bliznyuk

References

External links
 

Motor Zaporizhia
Motor Zaporizhia

Motor Sich